This is a list of football clubs in Malta and Gozo.

 
Malta
clubs
Football clubs